This is a complete list of rulers of Croatia under domestic ethnic and elected dynasties during the Croatian Kingdom (925–1918). This article follows the monarch's title number according to Hungarian succession for convenience. For example, the Hungarian monarch Béla IV is according to Croatian succession correctly titled Béla III. This is because Hungarians had a king named Béla prior to the incorporation of Croatia under the Hungarian Crown but the Croats did not.

Early history

The details of the arrival of the Croats in the Balkans are sparsely documented by more or less reliable historical sources. Around late 6th and early 7th century, Croats migrated from White Croatia (around present-day Galicia). According to a legend recorded in the 10th-century De Administrando Imperio, the Croats came to their present region under the leadership of five brothers (called Kloukas, Lobelos, Kosentzis, Mouchlo, and Chrobatos) and of two sisters (called Touga and Bouga).

It is theorized that one of the brothers, Chrobatos gave his name to the Croats as a whole, although mainstream historians dismiss this notion as not verifiable. The Croats started gradually converting to Christianity under the rule of Porga in the 7th century.

Dukes of Lower Pannonia (7th century–896) 

The areas of modern-day Croatia located in the Pannonian plain had also been settled by Slavic tribes in the early Middle Ages, and history recorded some of their rulers.

Dukes of Croatia (7th century–925) 

Slavic tribes known as the Croats settled to areas of present-day Croatia around the beginning of the 7th century, and their rulers started to be recorded in historical records in the late 8th century.

Kings of Croatia (925–1102) 

In his letter from 925, Pope John X refers to Tomislav I as Rex Chroatorum (King of the Croats). All Croatian rulers after Tomislav I held the title of King of Croatia. This is confirmed by epigraphic inscription mentioning the earliest known Croatian queen (regina) Domaslava dated to first half of 10th century.

Hungarian Kings of Croatia (1102–1527) 

From 1102, the reigning King of Hungary was also the ruler of the Kingdom of Croatia in agreement with the Croatian nobles. Croatia was governed on his behalf by a viceroy (ban) and a parliament (sabor).

Under the Habsburgs (1527–1918) 
On 1 January 1527, the Croatian Parliament met in Cetin to elect Ferdinand I of Habsburg as the new King of Croatia.

Kings of Yugoslavia (1918–1941) 

After the World War I and the breakup of Austria-Hungary, Croatia joined a newly formed State of Slovenes, Croats and Serbs. Following a brief period of self-rule, that state became part of the Kingdom of Serbs, Croats and Slovenes under the Karađorđević dynasty. The name of the kingdom was changed in 1929, amid unitarianist reforms, to the Kingdom of Yugoslavia. In 1941, Yugoslavia was occupied by the Axis powers along with the rest of Yugoslavia. The Axis set up the Independent State of Croatia as a puppet state, while many Croatians fought for the Yugoslav Partisans.

King of the Independent State of Croatia (1941–1943) 
During the Axis occupation of Yugoslavia, a puppet state under Italian protection called the Independent State of Croatia was created, with Ante Pavelić as its leader. Soon after its creation, the state government passed three laws on the creation of the Crown of Zvonimir, which made the country de jure a kingdom. Three days later the Treaties of Rome were signed. The Italian Prince Aimone of Savoy-Aosta was designated King of Croatia. He abdicated in 1943.

After WWII 

 List of heads of state of Yugoslavia (1945–1991)
 List of presidents of Croatia (1991–present)
 List of prime ministers of Croatia (1991–present)

Gallery

"Duke of Croatia"
The title Duke of Croatia has been used widely:
The Doges of Venice used it, with Byzantine approval, from c. 1100, when Hungary was in the process of absorbing the Kingdom of Croatia, until the Treaty of Zadar with Hungary in 1358.
The Dukes of Merania, whose territory bordered Croatia, were sometimes called Dukes of Croatia in contemporary chronicles.
Various Hungarian noblemen granted authority in the South Slav lands added Croatia to their title of Duke of Slavonia in the 13th and 14th centuries.

See also

Ban of Croatia
Ban of Slavonia
 List of rulers of Austria
 Croatian Parliament
 History of Croatia
 Timeline of Croatian history

References

External links 
 Monarchs of Croatia from Everything2
 The History Files: Kingdoms of Eastern Europe: Croatia
 WHKMLA History of Croatia, ToC
 Rulers of Croatia and Slavonia
 List of Croatian rulers PDF, University of Michigan
 
 List of Croatian Heads of State

Kingdom of Croatia

Croatia
Rulers
Rulers